Ramabai Government Women Post Graduate College was established in 1997 by the Government of Uttar Pradesh. The college is in the Ambedkar Nagar district of Uttar Pradesh in India. As a rural college, it is near the district headquarters Akbarpur.  It is an entirely government-owned higher education institute for female scholars. The college is affiliated to the Dr. Ram Manohar Lohia Avadh University, Faizabad.

Status 
The college has been recognized by the University Grants Commission (India) with 2 (f) and 12 (b) category. It receives aid or grants from the UGC, New Delhi and directly administered by the Department of Higher Education, Government of Uttar Pradesh (UP). The assessment and accreditation process of Ramabai Government Women Post Graduate College was completed by NAAC, Bangalore in April 2011 and awarded with Grade B (CGPA 2.17).

Administration
The college is administered by the Department of Higher Education, Government of UP. The directorate is located in Allahabad and the regional higher education office in Lucknow has the subsidiary control over the college. A principal has been appointed by the Department of Higher Education of Government of UP for the administrative and financial dealings at college, who is also the immediate officer to the faculties and staff.

Students
The college provides admission to female students after completion of 10+2 (intermediate) course work in different streams: Humanities, Science and Commerce. The strength of the students is about 1,385 (academic year: 2009-2010), which comprised various sections of society.

Faculty
The selection process of the faculty members is solely done by Public Service Commission of Uttar Pradesh. The commission ensures the minimum qualification by adopting the rules of UGC, New Delhi for the selection of the teachers in Government Degree Colleges of UP. After selection, the appointments are made by the Government of Uttar Pradesh after recommendation from the commission. All faculty members (Assistant Professor, Associate Professor and Professor) belong to Group-A service of the state and are Gazetted public servants.

Staff
A good number of office staff has been appointed in the college. Laboratory assistants have been appointed for the laboratories of science faculty as well as for the Department of Home Science.

Library
Ramabai Government Women Post Graduate College possesses large number of books and e-journals for Under Graduate (UG) and Post Graduate (PG) students in the Central Library.  A separate Post Graduate library is on the premises of the college for Post Graduate students. A librarian has been appointed by the Department of Higher Education, Government of UP to manage both libraries.

Programs and courses
The college offers Under Graduate and Post Graduate course works in different streams and programs: Bachelor of Arts (BA), Bachelor of Science (BSc), Bachelor of Commerce (BCom), Master of Arts (MA).

Extracurricular activities
The college provides opportunities to rural students to enhance their educational skills by participating in the talks, discussions, seminars, sports, NSS activities and being activist of Red Cross Society, beside lectures.

Associations
Parent-Faculty association and Alumnae association has been set up in the college for its overall educational development.

See also
Higher Education in India
Education in Uttar Pradesh
University Grants Commission (India)
National Assessment and Accreditation Council

References

Women's universities and colleges in Uttar Pradesh
Educational institutions established in 1997
1997 establishments in Uttar Pradesh
Colleges in Ambedkar Nagar district
Akbarpur, Ambedkar Nagar